Miss University Africa (MUA) is an annual international beauty pageant organized by Visions, Innovations and Concepts. The pageant was first held in 2010. Unlike Miss America and Miss Earth pageants, Miss University Africa contestants are not required to compete in swimsuits or bikinis. Founded by businessman Taylor Nazzal, the competition has 54 contestants who represent 54 countries in Africa, and the winner of the pageant receives US$50,000 in endorsement deals, a new car and becomes a United Nations Students' Ambassador.

The current title holder is Adar Yusuf Ibrahim from Somalia who was crowned on December 18, 2021, in Abuja, Nigeria.

Requirements
The pageant allows the participation of female contestants between the ages of 18 and 26 who are active university students with no marriage experience or children.

Titleholders

Countries by number of title wins

See also 

 List of beauty pageants

References

External links
 

Beauty pageants in Africa
International beauty pageants
Continental beauty pageants
Recurring events established in 2010
2010 establishments in Africa